Papyrus Oxyrhynchus 109 (P. Oxy. 109 or P. Oxy. I 109) is a list of personal property, written in Greek and discovered in Oxyrhynchus. The manuscript was written on papyrus in the form of a sheet. The document was written in the late 3rd or 4th century. Currently it is housed in the Houghton Library (SM. Inv. 2214) at Harvard University in Cambridge.

Description 
The document contains a list of personal effects, chiefly clothes. Several of the words recur in Papyrus Oxyrhynchus 114.

It was discovered by Grenfell and Hunt in 1897 in Oxyrhynchus. The text was published by Grenfell and Hunt in 1898.

Text
List of effects.

1 white garment of pure wool

2 white vests

2 undyed do.

1 purple do.

2 white veils

1 undyed do.

2 linen cloths from Tarsus (?)

2 shawls

2 tunics with a broad purple border

2 girdles

2 cloaks

2 shirts

3 cushions

3 pillows

2 mattresses

a woollen (?) tunic and veil

1 white tunic

1 new cover

3 bronze vessels

1 small vessel (?)

2 bronze kettles

1 gown

(Sent?) to the Oxyrhynchite nome:

1 band

2 chemises

20 minae of silver

See also 
 Oxyrhynchus Papyri
 Papyrus Oxyrhynchus 108
 Papyrus Oxyrhynchus 110
 Papyrus Oxyrhynchus 114

References 

109
3rd-century manuscripts
4th-century manuscripts